Charltona albimixtalis is a moth in the family Crambidae. It was described by George Hampson in 1919. It is found in Benin, Ghana, Nigeria and the Gambia.

References

Crambinae
Moths described in 1919
Taxa named by George Hampson